Monatin, commonly known as arruva, is a naturally occurring, high intensity sweetener isolated from the plant Sclerochiton ilicifolius, found in the Transvaal region of South Africa. Monatin contains no carbohydrate or sugar, and nearly no food energy, unlike sucrose or other nutritive sweeteners.

The name "monatin" is derived from the indigenous word for it, "molomo monate," which literally means "mouth nice."

Monatin is an indole derivative and, upon degradation, smells like feces.

It is 3000 times sweeter than sugar.

See also
 Sugar substitute

References

External links

Food additives
Sugar substitutes
Amino acids
Alpha hydroxy acids
Indoles
Dicarboxylic acids